Ramón Jiménez Fuentes (born 1 December 1955) is a Mexican politician from the Party of the Democratic Revolution. From 2009 to 2012 he served as Deputy of the LXI Legislature of the Mexican Congress representing Zacatecas.

References

1955 births
Living people
Party of the Democratic Revolution politicians
21st-century Mexican politicians
Politicians from Zacatecas
People from Nochistlán
Deputies of the LXI Legislature of Mexico
Members of the Chamber of Deputies (Mexico) for Zacatecas